The California rock lizards are a genus (Petrosaurus) of New World lizards in the family Phrynosomatidae.

Geographic range
They are endemic to southern California and Baja California, Mexico.

Habitat
This lizard species lives almost exclusively on rock outcrops, boulder piles, and canyon walls, where it shelters under rocks. Their habitat consists of arid and semiarid foothills and canyons along the western margin of the Colorado Desert.

Reproduction
The courtship begins shortly after emergence in early spring. The eggs are laid around June and July.

Predators
The few predators that could pursue this lizard are collared lizards and avian predators, such as hawks, ravens, and roadrunners.

Species
The genus Petrosaurus contains four species.
 Petrosaurus mearnsi (Stejneger, 1894) - banded rock lizard
 Petrosaurus repens (Van Denburgh, 1895)
 Petrosaurus slevini (Van Denburgh, 1922) - banded rock lizard
 Petrosaurus thalassinus (Cope, 1863) - Baja blue rock lizard

References

 
Fauna of the California chaparral and woodlands
Fauna of the Mojave Desert
Taxa named by George Albert Boulenger